An -superprocess, within mathematics probability theory is a stochastic process on  that is usually constructed as a special limit of near-critical branching diffusions.

Scaling limit of a discrete branching process

Simplest setting 

For any integer , consider a branching Brownian process  defined as follows:

 Each particle independently move according to a Brownian motion.
 Each particle independently dies with rate .
 When a particle dies, with probability  it gives birth to two offspring in the same location.

In other words,  is a measure-valued random process.

Now, define a renormalized process:

As will be clarified in the next section,  encodes an underlying branching mechanism, and  encodes the motion of the particles. Here, since  is a Brownian motion, the resulting object is known as a Super-brownian motion.

Generalization to -superprocesses 
Our discrete branching system  can be much more sophisticated, leading to a variety of superprocesses:

 A particle dies at rate 
Set  and define  the associated probability-generating function:

Provided all of these conditions, the finite-dimensional distributions of  converge to those of a measure-valued random process  which is called a -superprocess, with initial value .

Commentary on  

Generalization to Dawson-Watanabe superprocesses 
The branching particle system  can be further generalized as follows:

 When a particle following trajectory  dies at time , it gives birth to offspring according to a measure-valued probability kernel . In other words, the offspring are not necessarily born on their parent's location. Assume that .

Then, under suitable hypotheses, the finite-dimensional distributions of  converge to those of a measure-valued random process  which is called a Dawson-Watanabe superprocess, with initial value .

Properties 
A superprocess has a number of properties.

and the spatial motion of individual particles (noted  in the previous section) is given by the -symmetric stable process with infinitesimal generator .

The  case means  is a standard Brownian motion and the -superprocess is called the super-Brownian motion.

One of the most important properties of superprocesses is that they are intimately connected with certain nonlinear partial differential equations. The simplest such equation is  When the spatial motion (migration) is a diffusion process, one talks about a superdiffusion. The connection between superdiffusions  and nonlinear PDE's is similar to the one between diffusions and linear PDE's.

Further resources

References 

Spatial processes